Christopher John Barber (born in 1975 or 1976), and usually known as Chris Barber, is a Canadian trucking company operator, and activist who co-led the Canadian convoy protest. He was arrested on 17 February 2022 and released on bail the next day.

He gave evidence at the Public Order Emergency Commission in November 2022, speaking about his power struggles with fellow organizer Pat King.

Career 
Christopher John Barber is a truck driver from Swift Current, Saskatchewan who operates his own trucking company, C. B. Trucking Limited.

Activism 
Barber is vaccinated against COVID19, but considers vaccine mandates to be government tyranny. He has two confederate flags hanging in his home, which he described on a TikTok broadcast as a "piece of cloth." Barber operates two TikTok accounts BigRed1975 and ChrisBarber1975. Barber describes himself as an "internet troll."

Along with Pat King and Tamara Lich, Barber was one of three main organisers of the Canadian convoy protest. In January 2022, he spoke of his ambition to persuade politicians to end vaccine mandates. On February 2, in the context of noise complaints from Ottawa residents, he released the written statement: "Our message to the citizens of Ottawa is one of empathy".

Barber was arrested 17 February 2022, near Parliament Hill. Earlier the same week, Prime Minister Justin Trudeau had invoked the Emergencies Act, as part of a strategy to end the protest. Barber was charged with counselling to commit mischief, counselling to disobey a court order, and counselling to obstruct police. The next day, he was released from custody, on bail and ordered to leave Ottawa and to avoid contact with Tamara Lich and Pat King. Barber's court appearance is scheduled for September 5, 2023 and is expected to last 16 days.

During the November 2022 Public Order Emergency Commission, Barber spoke of his tension and power struggle with fellow organiser Pat King. He also spoke about his own racist and anti-muslim internet posts.

Personal life 
Barber is married to his wife, and has a son and daughter.

He was aged 46 in February 2022.

References

External links 
 CB Trucking Ltd, official website

Year of birth missing (living people)
Living people
Social media influencers
COVID-19 pandemic in Canada
Canadian anti-vaccination activists
Activists from Saskatchewan
People from Swift Current
1970s births
Canadian truck drivers
Protesters involved in the Canada convoy protest
Internet trolls